Richard Buhagiar (born 17 March 1972) is a former professional footballer. During his career, he played as a defender for Floriana, Sliema Wanderers, Marsaxlokk and Għajnsielem. Born in Australia, he represented the Malta national team.

Honours

Floriana
Winner
 1992/93 Maltese Premier League

Winner
 1993, 1994 Maltese Cup

Runner Up
 1988, 1989 Maltese Cup

Marsaxlokk
Runner Up
 2004 Maltese Cup

External links
 
  Richard Buhagiar  loaned to Sliema
  Richard Buhagiar  loaned to Marsaxlokk FC
 Ghajnsielem F.C Player Record

Living people
1972 births
Australian soccer players
Australian people of Maltese descent
People with acquired Maltese citizenship
Maltese footballers
Malta international footballers
Mosta F.C. players
Floriana F.C. players
Sliema Wanderers F.C. players
Marsaxlokk F.C. players
Għajnsielem F.C. players
Association football defenders